Livery in law may refer to:

 Livery of seisin, an archaic legal conveyancing ceremony, practiced in feudal England and in other countries
 Sasine, in Scots law, the delivery of feudal property, typically land
 Commission for Taxi Regulation, in Ireland
 Regulation of taxi cabs, in the United States